Thymus vulgaris (common thyme, German thyme, garden thyme or just thyme) is a species of flowering plant in the mint family Lamiaceae, native to southern Europe from the western Mediterranean to southern Italy.

It is useful in the garden as groundcover, where it can be short-lived, but is easily propagated from cuttings. It is also the main source of thyme as an ingredient in cooking and as an herbal medicine. It is slightly spicier than oregano and sweeter than sage.

The Latin specific epithet vulgaris means “common” in the sense of “widespread”.

Cultivars 
Numerous cultivars and hybrids have been developed for ornamental purposes. Nomenclature can be very confusing.
French, German and English varieties vary by leaf shape and colour and essential oils. 
The many cultivars include 'Argenteus' (silver thyme).

The cultivar 'Silver Queen', with white-margined leaves, has gained the Royal Horticultural Society's Award of Garden Merit.

See also
Thyme (discussion of culinary and medicinal uses)
Thymol, a disinfectant extract of essential oils

References

Bibliography

L. H. Bailey; Manual of Cultivated Plants.
M. Easter; International Thymus Register and Checklist.

External link
Thymi herba, European Medicines Agency

vulgaris
Flora of Algeria
Flora of Europe
Flora of Lebanon
Groundcovers
Herbs
Medicinal plants
Plants described in 1753
Subshrubs
Taxa named by Carl Linnaeus